The Glasgow and South Western Railway (GSWR) 45 class is a class of eleven 2-2-2 steam locomotives designed in 1865, an enlarged version of his 40 class intended for express passenger duties.

Development 
Eleven examples of this final express passenger class designed by Patrick Stirling for the FSWR were built at Kilmarnock Locomotive Works at regular intervals between March 1865 and July 1868 (Works Nos. 32, 39-40, 43-4, 47-8, 50-53). They were numbered 45, 151-6, 84, 61, 16 & 79. The members of the class were fitted with domeless boilers and safety valves over the firebox. The safety valves were later replaced by those of Ramsbottom design over the centre of the boiler following a boiler explosion at Springhill in 1876. They were fitted with Stirling’s own design of cab and open fan-like splashers.

Withdrawal 
The class were withdrawn Hugh Smellie between 1884 and 1887.

References 

 

045
2-2-2 locomotives
Standard gauge steam locomotives of Great Britain
Railway locomotives introduced in 1865
Scrapped locomotives